The Crocodile Coup is a play in the game contract bridge.  It is executed by the defense: specifically by the second hand to play to a trick. It is the play of a higher card than might seem necessary, to keep a run of honors from being blocked by a singleton honor being in the other hand with either no entry back to the remaining tricks, or having to return the lead to declarer who can promptly dispose of his losers.

In the following example, West executes the Crocodile Coup:

 With spades trump, South hopes to win four of the remaining five tricks. South leads the 4. Now:

If the East-West hands were reversed, it would take no special acumen for East to overtake West's K and cash the Q.

References

Contract bridge coups